This article contains the discography of American R&B singer, Tevin Campbell. This includes studio albums, compilation albums, and singles.

Studio albums

Compilation albums

Extended plays

Singles

As main artist

As featured artist

Notes
 Did not chart on the Hot R&B/Hip-Hop Songs chart (Billboard rules at the time prevented album cuts from charting). Chart peak listed represents the Hot R&B/Hip-Hop Airplay chart.

Album appearances

References

Discographies of American artists